Diego Armando Basto Rengifo (born 1 January 1988) is a Colombian football midfielder, who plays for Llaneros in Categoría Primera B. He previously played for Millonarios in the Copa Mustang.

References

1988 births
Living people
Colombian footballers
Millonarios F.C. players
Patriotas Boyacá footballers
Cúcuta Deportivo footballers
Fortaleza C.E.I.F. footballers
Real Cartagena footballers
Llaneros F.C. players
Categoría Primera B players
Association football midfielders
Footballers from Bogotá